Blake Jarwin (born July 16, 1994) is an American football tight end who is a free agent. He played college football at Oklahoma State and signed with the Dallas Cowboys as an undrafted free agent in 2017.

Early years
Jarwin attended Tuttle High School in Tuttle, Oklahoma, where he played high school football. As a senior, he posted seven receptions for 145 yards, 38 tackles (nine for loss) and three sacks. He was named to the All-city team. He also practiced baseball, basketball and track and field.

College career
He walked on at Oklahoma State University, where he played mostly as a blocking tight end and on special teams. As a redshirt freshman, he practiced but did not appear in any game. The next year, he tallied five receptions for 107 yards, including a 47-yard touchdown against Texas Tech.

Jarwin became a starter as a junior, appearing in 11 games while missing two due to injury. He recorded 17 receptions for 200 yards and two touchdowns. As a senior, he registered 19 receptions for 309 yards and two touchdowns.

He had career totals of 41 receptions, 616 receiving yards and five touchdowns. He graduated with a degree in Management.

College statistics

Professional career

2017 season: Rookie year
After going undrafted in the 2017 NFL Draft, Jarwin signed with the Dallas Cowboys as an undrafted free agent on May 12. He was waived on September 2, 2017 but was signed to the practice squad the next day. 

On October 26, 2017, Jarwin was promoted to the active roster, in order to avoid the Philadelphia Eagles signing him. The move forced the Cowboys to keep four tight ends. Jarwin appeared in only one game in 2017 and recorded no statistics.

2018 season
With the unexpected retirements of starter Jason Witten and backup James Hanna, Jarwin had a chance to compete for the starting tight end position, but was named the backup behind Geoff Swaim.

After Swaim was lost to an injury in Week 11, rookie Dalton Schultz passed Jarwin on the depth chart as the starter and was used mostly for blocking purposes. In the regular-season finale against the New York Giants, Jarwin had the best game of his career, catching seven passes for 119 yards and three touchdowns in a narrow 36-35 road victory. He became the sixth tight end in franchise history to post a 100-yard receiving game and was named the NFC Offensive Player of the Week due to his impressive performance.

Jarwin was named the starter for four games when the Cowboys used multiple tight end sets, finishing with 27 receptions for 307 yards and three touchdowns.

2019 season
In 2019, although Geoff Swaim left via free agency, Jason Witten returned to play professional football after spending one season as a Monday Night Football commentator. Jarwin was a backup at tight end behind Witten, posting 31 receptions for 365 yards and three touchdowns. Jarwin had a chance to start in seven contests, when the team opened the game in a two tight end formation.

2020 season
On March 16, 2020, Jarwin signed a three-year, $24.25 million contract extension. The following day, it was announced in the media that Jason Witten would be leaving the Cowboys to sign with the Las Vegas Raiders, making Jarwin the starter at tight end.

In the season opener against the Los Angeles Rams, Jarwin recorded a 12-yard reception in the first half before leaving the eventual 20-17 road loss with a knee injury. The next day, it was announced that he would be out for the season to undergo anterior cruciate ligament (ACL) surgery and was placed on injured reserve on September 15.

2021 season
Jarwin returned in 2021 as the backup to Dalton Schultz. He was placed on injured reserve on November 6, 2021 with a hip injury. He was activated on January 8, 2022.

On March 11, 2022, Jarwin was released by the Cowboys.

NFL statistics

Regular season

Postseason

References

External links
Oklahoma State Cowboys bio
Dallas Cowboys bio

1994 births
Living people
People from Grady County, Oklahoma
Players of American football from Oklahoma
American football tight ends
Oklahoma State Cowboys football players
Dallas Cowboys players
Sportspeople from Oklahoma City